Ivan Andy "Ike" Williams (January 3, 1903 – May 1977) was an American football player. Williams played college football at Georgia Tech, where he was a running back as well as a placekicker.

In 1925, Tech met rival Georgia for the first time since 1916. Williams thought the game clock read five seconds remaining in the third quarter when it was really five minutes.  Williams set up his offense for a field goal and kicked it to put Tech up 3–0 on first down, and Tech won the game 3–0. He then played professional football with the Newark Bears and Staten Island Stapletons. In his season with the Stapes, Williams suffered a season-ending injury against the New York Giants.

See also 

 List of Georgia Tech Yellow Jackets starting quarterbacks

References

1903 births
1977 deaths
American football halfbacks
American football quarterbacks
American football fullbacks
American football placekickers
Georgia Tech Yellow Jackets football players
Newark Bears (AFL) players
Staten Island Stapletons players
Players of American football from Arkansas
Sportspeople from Little Rock, Arkansas